Agelena tungchis is a species of spider in the family Agelenidae, which contains at least 1,315 species of funnel-web spiders . It was first described by Jeng-Di Lee in 1998. It is endemic to Taiwan.

References

tungchis
Spiders of Taiwan
Endemic fauna of Taiwan
Spiders described in 1998